Tulia Ackson (born 23 November 1976) is the Speaker of the National Assembly of Tanzania, in office since 2022. She was appointed as a Member of Parliament by President John Magufuli.

Early life 

Ackson was born on 23 November 1976 in Bulyaga Ward, Tukuyu Division, Rungwe District, Mbeya Region.

Education 

Ackson passed her primary education at Mabonde Primary School in Tukuyu from 1984 to 1990 where she obtained a certificate of Primary Education. She was selected to join Loleza Girls Secondary School in Mbeya where she obtained certificate of Secondary Education in 1994, and obtained an Advanced Certificate of Secondary Education at Zanaki Girls Secondary School. She then joined the University of Dar es Salaam in 1998 where she obtained a bachelor's degree in Laws in 2001. Ackson graduate a master's degree in Law in 2003. In 2004 she did her Bar Examinations and obtained a Certificate for Legal Practice in Tanzania. She was admitted at the University Cape Town in 2005 for a Doctoral studies and obtained a Doctorate in Philosophy in 2007.

Career 

Ackson joined the University of Dar es Salaam in 2001 where she started to work as a Postgraduate Teaching Assistant. She was promoted in 2004 to an Assistant Lecturer after successful completion of her master's degree in Law. In 2007 she was promoted to a lecturer after obtaining a Doctorate. In 2009 she became the Associate Dean of the University of Dar es Salaam School of Law and served in that position for a total of six years, thus, two terms of three years consecutively. She was promoted to a Senior Lecturer in 2011. In February 2014 Ackson was appointed by the President of Tanzania, Jakaya Kikwete, as a member of the first Constituent Assembly of Tanzania, representing higher learning institutions. She is a Member of Tanganyika Law Society, East African Law Society, and Southern African Development Law Society.

Ackson is an expert in social security law, labour law, wildlife management laws, trusts, probate and administration of estates law, project financing and mining law.

Ackson's experience also includes general commercial agreements, such as joint ventures, agency agreements, distributorship agreements, service agreements, mergers and acquisitions, Initial Public Offerings, Management Buy-Outs, employment, commercial and competition law.

Ackson is a practitioner with over 10 years' experience in employment law. She regularly writes articles and talks on employment law matters and her practice covers all aspects of Tanzania employment law, from hiring, to firing, to handling disputes between employers and employees.

She was appointed 7th Speaker of the National Assembly on 1 February 2022.

Presidential appointments  

Ackson was appointed by President Jakaya Kikwete as Deputy Attorney General, serving from 9 September 2015 to 15 November 2015.

On 16 November 2015 Ackson Mwansasu was appointed as a Member of Parliament by President John Magufuli.

References 

Living people
1976 births
University of Dar es Salaam alumni
Tanzanian civil servants
University of Cape Town alumni
Chama Cha Mapinduzi politicians
Chama Cha Mapinduzi MPs
Tanzanian MPs 2010–2015
21st-century Tanzanian lawyers
Tanzanian women lawyers

People from Mbeya Region
21st-century Tanzanian women politicians

21st-century women lawyers
Women legislative deputy speakers
Women legislative speakers
Speakers of the National Assembly (Tanzania)